Methyl-DMA (2,5-dimethoxy-N-methylamphetamine) is a lesser-known psychedelic drug and substituted methamphetamine.  It was first synthesized by Alexander Shulgin. In his book PiHKAL, the minimum dosage is listed as 250 mg, and the duration unknown. Methyl-DMA produces slight paresthesia. Very little data exists about the pharmacological properties, metabolism, and toxicity of Methyl-DMA.

See also 

 Phenethylamine
 Methyl-MA
 Psychedelics, dissociatives and deliriants

References 

Methamphetamines